Lordelo, often known as São Salvador de Lordelo, is a city located in Paredes Municipality, Porto District, Portugal. The former town was elevated to the status of a city in 2003; although it was proposed at that time that the name should be changed to São Salvador de Lordelo the law as enacted retained the name of Lordelo.

References

External links
INE.pt - Censos2011 R.Preliminares Parte 1, p.63
DIÁRIO DA REPÚBLICA — I SÉRIE-A: Lei No. 20/84 28 June 1960: elevation of Lordelo to a town
Portuguese Post office reference and postcode

Cities in Portugal